Massive Grooves from the Electric Church of Psychofunkadelic Grungelism Rock Music, often known simply as Massive Grooves, is the first solo album by King's X bassist Doug Pinnick under the name of Poundhound.

Track listing

The Japanese release has a bonus track.

Personnel
Doug Pinnick - all vocals, guitars, and bass
Chad Lyons - drums on tracks 3, 4, and 11
Jerry Gaskill - drums on tracks 5, 6, 7, 10, and 12
Shannon Larkin - drums on tracks 2, 8, 9, 13, and 14

References

1998 debut albums
Doug Pinnick albums
Metal Blade Records albums